Gerrard "Gerry" O'Sullivan (born 1964, London) is a television executive, who has held a number of executive media roles at BSkyB, BBC, Fox News, ABC, Deutsche Telekom and Digicel TV. Known as a technology evangelist, in 2009 The Telegraph named him as 'One of the most influential Britons in technology and in 2010 Wired named him as a "TV pioneer" in their annual survey of the U.K's Top 100 digital power brokers.

Career Timetable
O'Sullivan started his media career in 1985 as a broadcast engineer at the BBC. He became a senior studio and outside broadcast director of BBC Breakfast, BBC One O'Clock News, BBC Six O'Clock News, BBC Nine O'Clock News, Newsnight, and The Money Programme. He was the launch director of the BBC's first live virtual set programme: Working Lunch'' nominated for an RTS award.

In 1992, he moved to Sydney and was Head of Production for Australia's first 24-hour news channel TNC.

In 1995, he moved to New York to become CTO of New York's newest broadcast channel in 12 years WBIS.

In 1997, he moved to the newly launched Fox News Channel as CTO.

In 2000 he moved back to the UK to work for BSKYB eventually being promoted to Director of Strategic Product Development.

In 2010 he was asked to lead Deutsche Telekom  TV and OTT digital media business with over 5 million IPTV subscribers.

In 2014 -15, as Interim CEO for Digicel's TV group, he launched a number of next generation cloud based IPTV and quad play services throughout the Caribbean, South America and the Pacific.

In 2017, O'Sullivan was asked to join the Board of Directors for Piksel, an innovative cloud based video services company.

In 2018, O'Sullivan joined Eutelsat as Executive Vice Prisident, Global Tv and Video.

BSkyB Innovation 
At BSKYB he was responsible for the strategy and execution of the companies innovation launching Sky+HD, Sky Broadband and Sky 3D.

On 22 May 2006 Sky+ HD was launched, the UK's first HDTV service.

On 27 March 2007, Sky launched its Sky Anytime on TV Push-Video on Demand service.

In 2008 O'Sullivan's team first demonstrated the ability to produce and broadcast 3DTV in the UK, culminating two years later with the world's first football match broadcast in 3D. The first programme that was broadcast by Sky in 3D was the Arsenal vs Manchester United football match on Sunday 31 January 2010. The 3D match was available in nine hand-picked pubs in England and in Ireland. Sky launched its 3D services on 3 April with the Manchester United vs Chelsea football match being broadcast in over a thousand pubs across England in 3D.

On 30 July 2009, Sky confirmed the launch of a full online video-on-demand (VOD) service one of the earliest video OTT services.

On 29 April 2010, Sky launched their new video-on-demand service  Sky Anytime+

Personal life
He lives in West London with his wife and two children.

References

1964 births
Living people
British television executives
British television directors
Television people from London